John McCulloch (November 15, 1806 – May 15, 1879) was a Whig member of the U.S. House of Representatives from Pennsylvania.

John McCulloch was born in McCullochs Mills, Pennsylvania.  He attended the common schools and graduated from Jefferson College in Canonsburg, Pennsylvania, in 1825.  He studied medicine and graduated from the medical department of the University of Pennsylvania in 1829.  He commenced practice in Green Tree, Pennsylvania.  He moved to Petersburg, Pennsylvania, in 1830, where he practiced medicine until 1852.

McCulloch was elected as a Whig to the Thirty-third Congress.  He was not a candidate for renomination in 1854.  He resumed practicing medicine in Huntingdon, Pennsylvania.  He became affiliated with the Republican Party upon its formation in 1856.  He was a member of the State constitutional convention in 1874.  He died in Huntingdon in 1879 and was interred in Riverside Cemetery.

Sources

The Political Graveyard

1806 births
1879 deaths
Washington & Jefferson College alumni
Pennsylvania Republicans
People from Huntingdon County, Pennsylvania
Whig Party members of the United States House of Representatives from Pennsylvania
19th-century American politicians